The Continuing Appropriations and Military Construction, Veterans Affairs, and Related Agencies Appropriations Act, 2017, and Zika Response and Preparedness Act is an appropriations bill which extended funding at the previous year's levels up to December 9, 2016 (10 weeks). After this, a continuing resolution that extended fiscal year 2017 funding for the United States federal government from December 9, 2016, until April 28, 2017, was passed: the Further Continuing and Security Assistance Appropriations Act, 2017. The bill, passed after 10 months since the White House asked for such legislation, includes funding to help fight the Zika virus and study its effects, such as on unborn babies. It also included help for residents of Flint, Michigan and Louisiana. The bill averted a government shutdown mere days before the funding deadline.

See also
 List of bills in the 114th United States Congress

References

External links
 text of law

Acts of the 114th United States Congress
Zika virus
United States federal appropriations legislation